Iraklis Psachna Football Club is a Greek football club, based in Psachna, Euboea.

History
In 2009–10, Psachna earned promotion to the third tier of Greek football, Football League 2, for the first time in club history, as champions of Delta Ethniki Group 7.

In 2010–11, Psachna earned promotion to the second tier of Greek football, the Football League, for the first time in club history.

On 27 November 2011, in the fourth week of the 2011–12 Football League season, Iraklis Psachna achieved its first win in the Greek second tier in club historya 2–0 defeat of Diagoras.

Honours

Delta Ethniki
Winners (1): 2009–10 (Group 7)

References

Association football clubs established in 1936
Sports clubs in Euboea
Football clubs in Central Greece
1936 establishments in Greece